Bondey is a village in western Bhutan. It is located in the Paro Valley of Paro District.

At the 2005 census, its population was 570.

References 

Populated places in Bhutan